Melacheval (also spelt Melaseval) is a panchayat town in Tirunelveli district in the Indian state of Tamil Nadu.

Demographics
As of 2001, India census, Melacheval had a population of 7340. Males constitute 49% of the population and females 51%. Melacheval has an average literacy rate of 71%, higher than the national average of 59.5%: male literacy is 78%, and female literacy is 64%. In Melacheval, 12% of the population is under 6 years of age.

References

External links 
 An article on the Navaneethakrishnan temple in Melacheval in The Hindu.

Cities and towns in Tirunelveli district